Projections: The Journal for Movies and Mind  is an interdisciplinary peer-reviewed academic journal that explores the way in which the mind experiences, understands, and interprets the audio-semantic and narrative structures of cinema and other visual media. It is published by Berghahn Books in association with The Society for Cognitive Studies of the Moving Image and it is edited by Ted Nannicelli. The journal was the recipient of the 2008 AAP/PSP Prose Award for Best New Journal in Social  Sciences and Humanities.

Editors 
The following people have been editors of the journal:
 2009-2018: Stephen Prince
 2018-present: Ted Nannicelli

Indexing and abstracting 
Projections is indexed and abstracted in:
British Humanities Index
GEOBASE
FIAF International Index to Film Periodicals
International Bibliography of Book Reviews of Scholarly Literature on the Humanities and Social Sciences
International Bibliography of Periodical Literature
MLA International Bibliography

References

External links 
 

Film studies journals
English-language journals
Biannual journals
Berghahn Books academic journals
Publications established in 2009